Doug Mills (born 1960) is an American photographer who has covered the White House since 1983. He began working for The New York Times in 2002, having previously been the chief photographer for The Associated Press in Washington, in which capacity he won two Pulitzer prizes for team coverage. As of February 2019 he is a board member of the White House Correspondents' Association.

Early life
Mills was born in Greensboro, North Carolina in 1960. He studied at Northern Virginia Community College.

Career

Mills worked in the Washington, D.C. office of United Press International, the Associated Press, and The New York Times. Previously, he worked at a newspaper in Virginia. In 1993, he won a Pulitzer Prize for photography for covering the Bill Clinton 1992 presidential campaign. He won a second Pulitzer Prize for AP's coverage of the Clinton-Lewinsky scandal.

Mills won multiple awards at the "2021 Eyes of History Still Contest" of The White House News Photographers Association. His awards included Photographer of the Year and Political Photo of the Year (for a photo of then U.S. President Donald J. Trump leaving Air Force One during a lightning storm). Trump called Mills the "No. 1 photographer in the world." Of the seven U.S. presidents Mills covered, he considered Barack Obama the most "photogenic" and Trump the most "iconic."

In 2022, Mills covered his 16th Olympic Games.

It has been reported that Mills was the first photographer - in 2001 - to use a remote camera to photograph presidents.

References

External links

Living people
American photojournalists
The New York Times visual journalists
1960 births